SHARP is a Canadian men's lifestyle magazine published by Contempo Media Inc., a Canadian media, publishing, and content company headquartered in Toronto. SHARP magazine was launched in 2008 and is published six times per year, with two SHARP: The Book for Men special editions targeting premium and luxury consumers. Content includes fashion, travel, electronics, automobiles, food, alcohol, advice, and essays of international scope but from a Canadian perspective.

In addition to being published in Canada, SHARP was licensed for publication in Russia in 2011.

References

External links
Official website

2008 establishments in Ontario
Men's magazines published in Canada
Eight times annually magazines
Magazines established in 2008
Magazines published in Toronto
Men's fashion magazines